Nováki Channel originates on the Mosoni Plain, Little Hungarian Plain, in the county of Györ-Moson-Sopron Hungary. It runs South up to Mecsér, where it flows to Mosoni-Duna.

Settlements at the banks 
 Püski
 Arak
 Darnózseli
 Mecsér

Rivers of Hungary
Geography of Győr-Moson-Sopron County